The Copa Paulino Alcantara, also known as the PFL Cup, is an annual football tournament in Philippines, sanctioned by the Philippine Football Federation. The cup's first iteration began on September 1, 2018. It replaced the PFF National Men's Club Championship and the UFL Cup as the country's top domestic cup tournament.

History
Following the success of the Philippines national team in the 2010 AFF Suzuki Cup, Philippine football experienced a renaissance. However, the country had no true national league nor a cup competition (the national cup competition was last held in 2007, to celebrate the Philippine Football Federation's centennial). To help address this issue, Smart Communications in January 2011, approached the PFF with an offer to finance a new local football competition. The proposed partnership was set to last 10 years, with Smart releasing ₱80 million in funds with the aim of providing more playing opportunities for skilled football players, and the eventual creation of a national league. Newly installed PFF president Mariano V. Araneta subsequently approved the proposal. In March 2011, the new tournament commenced under the name PFF–Smart Men's Club Championship. However,
the competition only lasted for four years, with the last edition being held in 2014–15 PFF National Men's Club Championship.

After the PFF announced the creation of a new national league, the federation confirmed that a new domestic cup competition was also to be formed.

Planning
The proposed competition was tentatively named as the PFL Cup, but was ultimately changed into "Copa Paulino Alcantara" in March 2018, in commemoration of former FC Barcelona legend and Filipino footballer Paulino Alcántara. It was planned that the cup will be held simultaneously with the Philippines Football League regular season. However, the cup was not played in the inaugural year, in 2017, with the cup being replaced by the Finals Series, a playoff for the top teams of the regular season. Ceres–Negros F.C. won the inaugural Finals Series and the regular season.

First edition
For the 2018 season, the league announced in February of that year that cup will now proceed, but instead of taking place in the middle of the PFL regular season, it was set to be held after it.

On July 15, 2018 during the PFL Fans Day, it was announced that non-franchise clubs are eligible to join the cup competition, provided that they will satisfy minimum licensing requirements which will be set for the competition. However, no non-PFL club joined the inaugural edition. The first Copa Paulino Alcantara commenced on September 1, 2018 with Kaya–Iloilo winning over Davao Aguilas in the final.

Second edition
When the Philippine Premier League was officially launched in January 2019, following the folding of the PFL, it was announced that the Copa Paulino Alcantara would be retained. However, the PPL was short-lived and PFL was relaunched within the year.

COVID-19 pandemic
Due to the COVID-19 pandemic in the Philippines, the 2020 edition of Copa Paulino Alcantara was not held.

Third edition 
The third edition was announced as a replacement of the cancelled 2020 Philippines Football League.

List of finals

Performance by club

CoPA 2023 Expansion 
The expansion of the Philippine Football Federation will start at the 2023 Copa Paulino Alcantara, introducing 10 new teams that might participate in the next Philippine Football League season (PFL 2023-2024 season). The federation has no announcement about the teams joining the 2023 Copa Paulino Alcantara at this time.

Branding
The logo for the Copa Paulino Alcantara was derived from a design competition. The cup tournament's logo was that of Joel Alejo, a Nueva Vizcaya native who is an Overseas Filipino Worker based in Saudi Arabia, announced as the winner of design competition.

The logo design competition was organized by the Liga Futbol Inc. from May 9 to 31, 2018 and was opened to Filipino citizens. The winning design was selected by a panel of five judges selected "based on their industry background."

The LFI announced that they have received more than 150 entries and would reveal the winner of the competition at the PFL Fans Day event on June 30, 2018. However, due to "overwhelming response" to the competition, the LFI moved the announcement of the winning design to July 15, and stated that the final judging of entries was to be held on July 13. The winning design was then announced on July 27, 2018.

Media coverage
The Copa Paulino Alcantara has been livestreamed on Facebook, from the first matches of the 2018 edition. In addition, the inaugural final was broadcast live by ESPN5 on AksyonTV, as well as on YouTube. In the 2021 edition, One Sports will cover the whole tournament. The most recent edition of the CoPA was uploaded in the Philippine Football League YouTube channel

See also
 Philippines Football League
 PFF National Men's Club Championship
 Football in the Philippines

References

External links
 Philippines Football League
 Philippines Football Federation

 
Football cup competitions in the Philippines
National association football league cups
2018 establishments in the Philippines
Recurring sporting events established in 2018